Funnell is an English surname and it may refer to:

 Ben Funnell, New Zealand rugby union player
 Harry Funnell, English cricketer
 Jenny Funnell, English television actress
 Peter Funnell, Curator of Nineteenth-Century Portraits and Head of Research Programmes at the National Portrait Gallery, London.
 Pippa Funnell (born 1968), English equestrian sportswoman, or her husband
 Ray Funnell, Royal Australian Air Force chief
 Robert Funnell, Queensland Legislative Assembly member
 Simon Funnell, English former professional footballer
 Stephen Funnell, Australian former rugby league footballer
 Tony Funnell, English retired professional football forward
 William Funnell (born 1966), English equestrian
 William Funnell (public servant) (1891–1962), Australian public servant

External links
 http://www.funnell.org/